Ozzie B. Clay (September 10, 1941 – March 8, 2005) was an American football safety who played professionally in the National Football League (NFL) for the Washington Redskins. He played college football at Iowa State University and was selected in the 17th round of the 1964 NFL Draft. Clay died on March 8, 2005, at Washington Hospital Center in Washington, D.C.

References

External links
 

1941 births
2005 deaths
American football safeties
Iowa State Cyclones football players
Washington Redskins players
People from Hickory, North Carolina
Players of American football from North Carolina